Jorge Meléndez Ramírez (April 15, 1871 – November 22, 1953), was born to Rafael Meléndez and Mercedes Ramírez (daughter of Norberto Ramírez). Married to Tula Mazzini, he had three children: Jorge (who died in his youth), María de los Angeles, and Ricardo. He was the younger brother of president Carlos Meléndez.

He served as 26th President of El Salvador from  March 1, 1919 to March 1, 1923.

Presidents of El Salvador
1871 births
1953 deaths
People from San Salvador
20th-century Salvadoran politicians